Tisha Terrasini Banker (born September 30, 1973) is an American actress.

Early life 
Banker was born in St. Louis, Missouri and graduated from St. Joseph's Academy. She earned a Bachelor of Arts degree from Loyola University New Orleans and a MFA from DePaul University.

Career 
She has appeared in numerous plays in various cities, including The Idiot Box, Because They Have No Words, The Book of Liz, Midsummer Night's Dream, and Playhouse Creatures. On television, her credits include roles on Criminal Minds, Sleeper Cell, and Joey. As a voice actress, she voiced "Miss Ni" in The Emperor's New School, The Powerpuff Girls and "Captain Aurora Soleil" (recurring role) in Duck Dodgers.

Personal life
She is married to Mark Philip Banker, a screenwriter. They currently reside in Los Angeles. She is also a sister of the Theta Phi Alpha fraternity.

Filmography

Film

Television

References

External links
 

1973 births
Living people
American television actresses
American stage actresses
American voice actresses
Actresses from St. Louis
Loyola University New Orleans alumni
DePaul University alumni
21st-century American women